Tomer Sisley (born Tomer Gazit; ; born 14 August 1974) is an Israeli and French actor and comedian.

Early and personal life
Born in West Berlin, West Germany, to Israeli-born parents who had relocated for his father's job as a research scientist in dermatology. His mother is also a dermatologist. His parents met as schoolmates in Ramat Gan, Israel, and were childhood sweethearts. His father's family has roots in Lithuania and Belarus, while his mother is of Yemeni descent.

His parents separated when he was five years old. At 9 years of age he left Berlin to live with his father in southern France, where his father was offered a position.  He is fluent in German, Hebrew, French, and English. He attended an English-speaking school, and then attended the bi-lingual Centre international de Valbonne in Sophia Antipolis near Nice, France.    

Sisley resides in Paris with his family, and has taught Hebrew to his three children. He spends about a month a year in Israel where most of his relatives reside, and has cousins and uncles who were in the Israeli Special Forces. He is a horse rider, practiced 5 years of Krav Maga, and trains in jiujitsu and boxing. He is also a helicopter pilot, and also races boats, does skydiving, paragliding, and extreme skiing.

Career

Comedy
Sisley performed six years of stand-up comedy. In 2003 he was the first French stand-up comedian to win the Just for Laughs comedy festival in Canada, the largest comedy festival in the world.

Scandal
In early summer 2019, it was brought to light that, in France Tomer was giving a literal introduction to American stand-up, performing jokes and routines - sometimes word for word - from nearly 20 English-speaking comedians, largely from stand-up specials performed from 1999 to 2004. Sisley appeared to have taken individual bits from Ted Alexandro, Jon Stewart, Nick Swardson, Mitch Hedberg and, of course, the perennially-stolen-from Bill Hicks. And many, many more.

Film

Among his first films were the Tunisian fictional film Bedwin Hacker (2003), the comedy drama Virgil (2005), the French romantic comedy-drama Toi et moi (2006), the French crime film Truands (2007), and the French action thriller Largo Winch (2008). In 2009, Sisley won the Most Promising Newcomer title at the Étoiles d'or French awards for his acting in Largo Winch.

In 2011, Sisley accepted the leading part in a low-budget French thriller film Sleepless Night. The movie was bought by Tribeca Productions, Robert De Niro's distribution company, and Warner Brothers bought the rights for a remake. The film showed at the Tribeca Film Festival, Toronto International Film Festival, and Rome Film Festival.

In the French action thriller Largo Winch II (2011), Sisley performed a fight while skydiving from a plane without a parachute. He does all of his own stunts. Among his next films were the American comedy We're the Millers (2013), the French costume drama and adventure film Angélique (2013), and the Israeli-French docudrama  political thriller Rabin, the Last Day (2015).

In the American thriller web television series Messiah (2020) Sisley plays Israeli Shin Bet intelligence officer Aviram Dahan.

Filmography
1996 : Studio Sud (TV) as Nico 
1998 : L'Immortel (TV) as Felix
2003 : Dédales by René Manzor as Malik 
2003 : Bedwin Hacker by Nadia el Fani as Chams, a Tunisian-French journalist
2005 : Virgil by Mabrouk el Mechri as Dino Taliori
2006 : Toi et moi by Julie Lopes-Curval as Farid
2006 : The Nativity Story by Catherine Hardwicke as Tax Collector
2007 : Truands by Frédéric Schoendoerffer as Larbi, a Moroccan gangster
2008 : Largo Winch by Jérôme Salle as Largo Winch
2011 : Largo Winch II by Jérôme Salle as Largo Winch
2011 : Sleepless Night by Frédéric Jardin as Vincent, a police detective
2013 : We're the Millers by Rawson Marshall Thurber as Pablo Chacón, a Mexican drug lord
2013 : Kidon by Emmanuel Naccache as Daniel
2013 : Angélique by Ariel Zeitoun as Marquis de Plessis-Bellière, a French aristocrat
2015 : Rabin, the Last Day by Amos Gitai as Rabin's driver
2018 : Balthazar as Raphaël Balthazar, a forensic pathologist
2019 : Lucky Day as Jean-Jacques
2020: Messiah by James McTeigue and Kate Woods as Aviram Dahan, an Israeli Shin Bet officer
2021: Don't Look Up as Adul Grelio

References

External links

Instagram page

1974 births
Living people
French male film actors
French male television actors
French people of Yemeni descent
Israeli people of Yemeni descent 
Israeli male film actors
Israeli male television actors
Jewish French male actors
French people of Israeli descent
French people of Belarusian-Jewish descent
French people of Lithuanian-Jewish descent
French people of Yemeni-Jewish descent
Israeli people of Belarusian-Jewish descent
Israeli people of Lithuanian-Jewish descent
Israeli people of Yemeni-Jewish descent
German emigrants to France
Male actors from Berlin
20th-century French male actors
21st-century French male actors
French humorists
French film directors
French male screenwriters
French screenwriters
20th-century Israeli male actors
21st-century Israeli male actors
Israeli humorists
Israeli film directors
Israeli male screenwriters